Lip Sync Battle UK is a British musical reality competition television series based on the American version of the same name. It premiered on Channel 5 on 8 January 2016. It is hosted by Mel B and Professor Green. The concept was introduced on the American chat show Late Night with Jimmy Fallon, in which celebrities battle each other with lip sync performances. It has been used as a recurring segment on The Tonight Show Starring Jimmy Fallon before being developed as a separate show.

Production
Whizz Kid Entertainment, producers of the series, announced that the first series would consist of eight episodes. However, upon broadcast, only six episodes were shown, with two episodes, Daisy Lowe vs Matt Richardson and Chris Ramsey vs Aston Merrygold, remaining unaired. On 7 November 2016 Channel 5 confirmed that a second series, comprising six episodes, plus an additional Christmas Special, had been ordered and would broadcast from January 2017.

Despite this, only four episodes aired, with episodes Robert Webb vs Sally Phillips and Joey Essex vs Louie Spence going unaired. In March 2018, the third run of episodes was broadcast by Channel 5; however, despite some listings referring to them as a third series, the four-episode run consisted of the four unaired episodes from the first two series.

Series overview

Episodes 
''Winners are listed in bold

Series 1 (2016)

Christmas Special (2016)

Series 2 (2017–2018)

References

External links 

2010s British music television series
2010s British reality television series
2016 British television series debuts
2018 British television series endings
British television series based on American television series
English-language television shows
Channel 5 (British TV channel) reality television shows
Musical game shows
Television shows shot at BBC Elstree Centre